The show's inaugural Hungarian season ended on 19 December 2010. Csaba Vastag was announced as the winner. It was broadcast on the commercial RTL Klub television station.

Auditions

The auditions started in the summer of 2010, with more than 5,000 candidates for the first series in Hungary.

Bootcamp

The Bootcamp was in the Thalia Theatre where 150 singers competed. In the first round the contestants sang a song of their choice. The judges immediately told the contestants if they were safe or not. In the second round only 50 contestants competed and they chose a song for themselves from a list. After this, based on the judges decision 24 contestants went to the third round called "Judge's houses".

Judge's houses

At this stage of the competition each judge mentored six acts. Each judge had help from a guest judge to choose their final acts.
Keresztes was helped by Zoltán Ádok, Malek by his sister Andrea Malek, Nagy by Dániel Abebe, and Geszti by Mariann Falusi. Contestants performed one song for their respective judge. Each judge and their guest eliminated three acts, leaving twelve remaining. The judges' houses stage was broadcast in two episodes on 9 and 10 October 2010.

The twelve eliminated acts were:
Boys: Dávid Hegyi, Teó Spiriev, Előd Szabó 
Girls: Enikő Muri, Katica Németh, Dzsenifer Szirota
Over 25s: Kriszta Bakó, Dávid Nádor, Zsolt Wittmann
Groups: Conformity, Karma, Nóra Réder és Kádár Szabolcs

Contestants

The top twelve acts were confirmed as follows:
The following artists made it to the live shows.

Key:
 – Winner
 – Runner-up
 – Third place

Results summary

{|
|-
| – mentored by Péter Geszti (Girls)
|| – Bottom two
|-
| – mentored by Ildikó Keresztes (Boys)
| – Safe
|-
| – mentored by Miklós Malek (Groups)
|-
| – mentored by Feró Nagy (Over 25s)
|-
|}

Live shows

Week 1 (16 October)

Theme: 21st century
Celebrity performer: Viktor Varga ("Lehet zöld az ég")
Group performance: "És megindul a föld"

Judge's vote to eliminate
 Nagy: Mimi és Gergő
 Malek: Mariann Szabó
 Keresztes: Mimi és Gergő
 Geszti: Mimi és Gergő

Week 2 (23 October)

Theme: Divas and Heartbreakers
Celebrity performer: Zséda ("És megindul a föld" / "A skorpió hava" / "Rám valahol egy férfi vár")
Group performance: "Ha lemegy a Nap"

Judge's vote to eliminate
 Geszti: Summer Sisters
 Malek: Fanni Domokos
 Keresztes: Fanni Domokos
 Nagy: Fanni Domokos

Week 3 (30 October)

Theme: Rock songs
Celebrity performer: Gabi Tóth ("Elég volt")
Group performance: "Ha zene szól"

Judge's vote to eliminate
 Malek: Veca Janicsák
 Geszti: Summer Sisters
 Nagy: Summer Sisters
 Keresztes: Summer Sisters

Week 4 (6 November)

Theme: Movie themes
Celebrity performer: Anti Fitness Club ("Sohase mondd")
Group performance: "Tépj szét"

Judge's vote to eliminate
 Malek: Mariann Szabó
 Geszti: Mariann Szabó
 Nagy: Dorka Shodeinde
 Keresztes: Dorka Shodeinde

Week 5 (13 November)

Theme: Songs from the toplists
Celebrity performer: Back II Black ("Úgy vártalak" / "Tevagyazakitalegjobban" / "Nánénáné")
Group performance: "Gyere kislány, gyere" and "8 óra munka"

Judge's vote to eliminate
 Keresztes: Non Stop
 Malek: Nikolas Takács
 Nagy: Non Stop
 Geszti: Non Stop

Week 6 (20 November)

Theme: Party anthems
Celebrity performer: András Csonka  ("Ding-Dong")
Group performance: "Ezt egy életen át kell játszani"

Judge's vote to eliminate
 Geszti: Tamás Vastag
 Keresztes: Dorka Shodeinde
 Malek: Dorka Shodeinde
 Nagy: Tamás Vastag

Week 7 (27 November)

Theme: One-hit Wonders
Celebrity performer: Up! ("Süt a Nap" / "Mindenki táncoljon"), Adrien Szekeres ("Olyan, mint Te")
Group performance: "Megtalállak"

Judge's vote to eliminate
 Keresztes: Kati Wolf
 Nagy: Nikolas Takács
 Malek: Nikolas Takács
 Geszti: Kati Wolf

Week 8 (4 December)

Theme: One Hungarian and one English song
Celebrity performer: Zoltán Bereczki ("Szállj velem")
Group performance: "Színezd újra!"

Judge's vote to eliminate
 Keresztes: Csaba Vastag
 Nagy: Tamás Vastag
 Geszti: Tamás Vastag
 Malek: Tamás Vastag

Week 9 (11 December)

Theme: One Hungarian and one English song
Celebrity performer: Ákos ("A fénybe nézz")
Group performance: "Bennünk a világ"

Judge's vote to eliminate
 Geszti: Csaba Vastag
 Nagy: Veca Janicsák
 Malek: Csaba Vastag
 Keresztes: Veca Janicsák

Week 10 (18–19 December)

Saturday 

Theme: One song performed on the audition, one with a surprise duet partner, one chosen as the judges' favourite
Celebrity performer: István Tabáni ("Ments meg!")
Group performance (by the eliminated finalists): "Ajándék" 
Duets:
Norbi L. Király and Lajos D. Nagy
Nikolas Takács and Kati Kovács
Csaba Vastag and Tamás Vastag

Sunday, Finals 

Theme: Christmas, finalist's favourite previously performed song, Winner Song
Celebrity performers: Annamari Farkas and Zoli Ádok ("Három álom") and Első Emelet ("Ma van a Te napod")
Group performance (by the eliminated finalists): "Shake Up Christmas" and "A nagy találkozás"

Ratings

References

Hungary 01
Hungarian television shows
2010 Hungarian television series debuts
2010 Hungarian television series endings
2010s Hungarian television series
2010 Hungarian television seasons